Danylo is the Ukrainian version of Daniel and may refer to:

Given name

Rulers
 Danylo of Galicia (1201–1264), first king of Ruthenia
 Danylo Apostol (1654–1734), Hetman of the Zaporizhian Host
 Danylo Ostrozky (died after 1366), Lithuanian nobleman, probably Prince of Turaŭ, first Prince of Ostroh

Footballers
 Danylo Beskorovaynyi (born 1999), Ukrainian footballer
 Danylo Buhayenko (born 2002), Ukrainian footballer
 Danylo Dmytriyev (born 2002), Ukrainian footballer
 Danylo Honcharuk (born 2002), Ukrainian footballer
 Danylo Ihnatenko (born 1997), Ukrainian footballer
 Danylo Kanevtsev (born 1996), Ukrainian football goalkeeper
 Danylo Kravchuk (born 2001), Ukrainian footballer
 Danylo Kucher (born 1997), Ukrainian football goalkeeper
 Danylo Lazar (born 1989), Ukrainian footballer
 Danylo Polonskyi (born 2001), Ukrainian footballer
 Danylo Ryabenko (born 1998), Ukrainian footballer
 Danylo Safonov (born 2002), Ukrainian footballer
 Danylo Sahutkin, Ukrainian footballer
 Danylo Sydorenko (born 2003), Ukrainian footballer
 Danylo Sikan (born 2001), Ukrainian footballer
 Danylo Udod (born 2004), Ukrainian footballer
 Danylo Varakuta (born 2001), Ukrainian football goalkeeper

Other athletes
 Danylo Danylenko (born 1994), Ukrainian hurdler
 Danylo Dutkevych (born 1990), Ukrainian track cyclist
 Danylo Konovalov (born 2003), Ukrainian diver
 Danylo Seredin, Ukrainian Paralympic athlete
 Danylo Sapunov (born 1982), Kazakhstani and Ukrainian triathlete
 Danylo Siianytsia (born 2000), Ukrainian pairs skater
 Daniil Sobchenko (1991–2011), Ukrainian-Russian professional ice hockey player

Other
 Danylo Hetmantsev (born 1978), Ukrainian politician
 Danylo Lyder (1917–2002), Ukrainian set designer and teacher
 Danylo Matviienko (born 1990), Ukrainian operatic baritone
 Pika Danylo (1901–1941), Ukrainian musician
 Danylo Skoropadskyi (1904–1957), Ukrainian politician and Crown Prince of Ukraine
 Danylo Terpylo (1886–1919), Ukrainian military leader during the Russian Civil War
 Danylo Yanevskyi (born 1956), Ukrainian historian, journalist, TV personality and radio host

Surname
 Bohdan Danylo (born 1971), Ukrainian Roman Catholic bishop in the United States
 Roman Danylo, Canadian comedian

See also

Danilo (disambiguation)

Ukrainian masculine given names